This article is a list of stadiums in North America.

List

Bermuda
Bermuda National Stadium – Hamilton

Canada

Greenland
Nuuk Stadium – Nuuk

Mexico

Professional sports

Football

Liga MX
Estadio Akron – Zapopan, Jalisco
Estadio Alfonso Lastras – San Luis Potosí City, San Luis Potosí
Estadio Azteca – Tlalpan, Mexico City
Estadio BBVA – Guadalupe, Nuevo León
Estadio Caliente – Tijuana, Baja California
Estadio Corona – Torreón, Coahuila
Estadio Corregidora – Querétaro City, Querétaro
Estadio Cuauhtémoc – Puebla City, Puebla
Estadio Hidalgo – Pachuca, Hidalgo
Estadio Jalisco – Guadalajara, Jalisco
Estadio León – León, Guanajuato
Estadio de Mazatlán – Mazatlán, Sinaloa
Estadio Nemesio Díez – Toluca, State of Mexico
Estadio Olímpico Benito Juárez – Ciudad Juárez, Chihuahua
Estadio Olímpico Universitario – Coyoacán, Mexico City
Estadio Universitario – San Nicolás de los Garza, Nuevo León
Estadio Victoria – Aguascalientes City, Aguascalientes

Liga de Expansión MX
Estadio Andrés Quintana Roo – Cancún, Quintana Roo
Estadio Azul – Benito Juárez, Mexico City
Estadio Banorte – Culiacán, Sinaloa
Estadio Carlos Iturralde – Mérida, Yucatán
Estadio Carlos Vega Villalba – Zacatecas City, Zacatecas
Estadio Gregorio "Tepa" Gómez – Tepatitlán de Morelos, Jalisco
Estadio Héroe de Nacozari – Hermosillo, Sonora
Estadio Jalisco – Guadalajara, Jalisco
Estadio Marte R. Gómez – Ciudad Victoria, Tamaulipas
Estadio Miguel Alemán Valdés – Celaya, Guanajuato
Estadio Morelos – Morelia, Michoacán
Estadio Olímpico de Villahermosa – Villahermosa, Tabasco
Estadio Tamaulipas – Tampico/Ciudad Madero, Tamaulipas
Estadio Tecnológico de Oaxaca – Oaxaca City, Oaxaca
Estadio Tlahuicole – Tlaxcala City, Tlaxcala

Baseball

LMB
Estadio Alberto Romo Chávez – Aguascalientes City, Aguascalientes
Estadio Alfredo Harp Helú – Iztacalco, Mexico City
Estadio Beto Ávila – Cancún, Quintana Roo
Estadio Centenario 27 de Febrero – Villahermosa, Tabasco
Estadio Chevron – Tijuana, Baja California
Estadio Domingo Santana – León, Guanajuato
Estadio Eduardo Vasconcelos – Oaxaca City, Oaxaca
Estadio Francisco I. Madero – Saltillo, Coahuila
Estadio Francisco Villa – Durango City, Durango
Estadio Hermanos Serdán – Puebla City, Puebla
Estadio Mobil Super – Monterrey, Nuevo León
Estadio Monclova – Monclova, Coahuila
Estadio Nelson Barrera – Campeche City, Campeche
Estadio Revolución – Torreón, Coahuila
Parque Kukulcán Alamo – Mérida, Yucatán
Parque la Junta – Nuevo Laredo, Tamaulipas
Uni-Trade Stadium – Laredo, Texas

LMP
Estadio B'Air – Mexicali, Baja California
Estadio Emilio Ibarra Almada – Los Mochis, Sinaloa
Estadio Francisco Carranza Limón – Guasave, Sinaloa
Estadio Mobil Super – Monterrey, Nuevo León
Estadio Manuel "Ciclón" Echeverría – Navojoa, Sonora
Estadio Panamericano – Guadalajara, Jalisco
Estadio Sonora – Hermosillo, Sonora
Estadio Teodoro Mariscal – Mazatlán, Sinaloa
Estadio Tomateros – Culiacán, Sinaloa
Estadio Yaquis – Ciudad Obregón, Sonora

American football

LFA
Estadio Borregos – Monterrey, Nuevo León
Estadio José Ortega Martínez – Naucalpan de Juárez, State of Mexico
Estadio Olímpico Francisco I. Madero – Saltillo, Coahuila
Estadio Universitario BUAP – Puebla City, Puebla

ONEFA
Estadio Borregos – Monterrey, Nuevo León
Estadio Coliseo Maya – Cancún, Quintana Roo
Estadio Corral de Plástico – Atizapán, State of Mexico
Estadio Gaspar Mass – San Nicolás de los Garza, Nuevo León
Estadio José Ortega Martínez – Naucalpan de Juárez, State of Mexico
Estadio Juan Josafat Pichardo – Toluca, State of Mexico
Estadio La Congeladora – Toluca, State of Mexico
Estadio La Cueva del León – Huixquilucan, State of Mexico
Estadio Marte R. Gómez – Ciudad Victoria, Tamaulipas
Estadio Olímpico Universitario – Coyoacán, Mexico City
Estadio Olímpico Universitario José Reyes Baeza – Chihuahua City, Chihuahua
Estadio P. R. Tapia – Chapingo, State of Mexico
Estadio Templo del Dolor – Cholula, Puebla
Estadio Tres de Marzo – Zapopan, Jalisco
Estadio Universitario BUAP – Puebla City, Puebla
Estadio USBI – Xalapa, Veracruz
Estadio Wilfrido Massieu – Miguel Hidalgo, Mexico City

Bullfighting
Coliseo Centenario – Torreón, Coahuila
Plaza de Toros México – Benito Juárez, Mexico City
Plaza de Toros Monumental de Aguascalientes – Aguascalientes City Aguascalientes
Plaza de Toros Monumental de Tijuana – Tijuana, Baja California
Plaza Monumental de Morelia – Morelia, Michoacán
Plaza Nuevo Progreso – Guadalajara, Jalisco

Saint-Pierre and Miquelon
Stade John Girardin – Saint-Pierre

United States

Professional sports

Baseball

Major leagues

American Family Field – Milwaukee, Wisconsin (formerly Miller Park)
Angel Stadium of Anaheim – Anaheim, California (formerly Anaheim Stadium and Edison International Field at Anaheim)
Busch Stadium – St. Louis, Missouri
Chase Field – Phoenix, Arizona (formerly Bank One Ballpark)
Citi Field – Flushing, New York
Citizens Bank Park – Philadelphia
Comerica Park – Detroit
Coors Field – Denver
Dodger Stadium – Los Angeles
Fenway Park – Boston
Globe Life Field – Arlington, Texas
Great American Ball Park – Cincinnati
Guaranteed Rate Field – Chicago (formerly "New" Comiskey Park and U.S. Cellular Field)
Kauffman Stadium – Kansas City, Missouri (formerly Royals Stadium)
Marlins Park – Miami
Minute Maid Park – Houston (formerly The Ballpark at Union Station, Enron Field and Astros Field)
Nationals Park – Washington, D.C.
Oakland Coliseum – Oakland, California (formerly Network Associates Coliseum and McAfee Coliseum)
Oracle Park – San Francisco, California (formerly China Basin Ballpark, Pacific Bell Park, SBC Park, and AT&T Park)
Oriole Park at Camden Yards – Baltimore
Petco Park – San Diego
PNC Park – Pittsburgh
Progressive Field – Cleveland (formerly Jacobs Field)
T-Mobile Park – Seattle (formerly Safeco Field)
Target Field – Minneapolis
Tropicana Field – St. Petersburg, Florida (formerly Florida Suncoast Dome and the Thunder Dome)
Truist Park – Cumberland, Georgia (formerly SunTrust Park)
Wrigley Field – Chicago (formerly Weeghman Park and Cubs Park)
Yankee Stadium – The Bronx, New York

Minor leagues
121 Financial Ballpark – Jacksonville, Florida
Appalachian Power Park – Charleston, West Virginia
Arm & Hammer Park – Trenton, New Jersey (formerly Mercer County Waterfront Park)
AT&T Field – Chattanooga, Tennessee (formerly BellSouth Park)
AutoZone Park – Memphis, Tennessee
The Ballpark at Jackson – Jackson, Tennessee (formerly Pringles Park)
Bears & Eagles Riverfront Stadium – Newark, New Jersey
Bill Meyer Stadium – Knoxville, Tennessee (formerly Evans–Collins Field)
Bosse Field – Evansville, Indiana
Bowen Field – Bluefield, Virginia
Bowman Field – Williamsport, Pennsylvania
Campbell's Field – Camden, New Jersey
Canal Park – Akron, Ohio
Cheney Stadium – Tacoma, Washington
Chickasaw Bricktown Ballpark – Oklahoma City
Chukchansi Park – Fresno, California
Civic Stadium – Eugene, Oregon
Classic Park – Eastlake, Ohio
Coca-Cola Park – Allentown, Pennsylvania
Day Air Ballpark – Dayton, Ohio
Dell Diamond – Round Rock, Texas
Delta Dental Stadium – Manchester, New Hampshire (formerly Merchantsauto.com Stadium and Northeast Delta Dental Stadium)
The Diamond – Richmond, Virginia
Dickey-Stephens Park – Little Rock, Arkansas
Doubleday Field – Cooperstown, New York
Dunkin' Park – Hartford, Connecticut
Durham Bulls Athletic Park – Durham, North Carolina
Engel Stadium – Chattanooga, Tennessee
Fifth Third Field – Toledo, Ohio
Fluor Field at the West End – Greenville, South Carolina 
FNB Field – Harrisburg, Pennsylvania (formerly Metro Bank Park)
Frontier Field – Rochester, New York
Grainger Stadium – Kinston, North Carolina
Hadlock Field – Portland, Maine
Hammons Field – Springfield, Missouri
Harbor Park – Norfolk, Virginia
Herschel Greer Stadium – Nashville, Tennessee
Holman Stadium – Nashua, New Hampshire
Holman Stadium – Vero Beach, Florida
Joe W. Davis Stadium – Huntsville, Alabama
Joker Marchant Stadium – Lakeland, Florida
Joseph P. Riley Jr. Park – Charleston, South Carolina
LaGrave Field – Fort Worth, Texas
Lawrence–Dumont Stadium – Wichita, Kansas
LoanMart Field – Rancho Cucamonga, California (formerly the Epicenter)
Louisville Slugger Field – Louisville, Kentucky
Maimonides Park – Brooklyn, New York (formerly KeySpan Park and MCU Park)
McCoy Stadium – Pawtucket, Rhode Island
Medlar Field at Lubrano Park – State College, Pennsylvania
Midway Stadium – St. Paul, Minnesota
Modern Woodmen Park – Davenport, Iowa
Montgomery Riverwalk Stadium – Montgomery, Alabama
NBT Bank Stadium – Syracuse, New York (formerly Alliance Bank Stadium)
Nelson W. Wolff Municipal Stadium – San Antonio, Texas
Ogren Park at Allegiance Field – Missoula, Montana 
ONEOK Field – Tulsa, Oklahoma
Parkview Field – Fort Wayne, Indiana
Paul Eames Sports Complex – Albany, Georgia
Peoples Natural Gas Field – Altoona, Pennsylvania
Pioneer Park – Greeneville, Tennessee
PNC Field – Moosic, Pennsylvania (formerly Lackawanna County Stadium)
Point Stadium – Johnstown, Pennsylvania
Principal Park – Des Moines, Iowa (formerly Sec Taylor Stadium)
Rio Grande Credit Union Field at Isotopes Park – Albuquerque, New Mexico
Sahlen Field – Buffalo, New York
San Jose Municipal Stadium – San Jose, California
San Manuel Stadium – San Bernardino, California
Schaumburg Baseball Stadium – Schaumburg, Illinois (formerly Alexian Field)
Security Service Field – Colorado Springs, Colorado
Shrine on Airline – Metairie, Louisiana (formerly Zephyr Field)
Sioux Falls Stadium – Sioux Falls, South Dakota
Skylands Stadium – Augusta, New Jersey
Smith's Ballpark – Salt Lake City, Utah
Sutter Health Park – West Sacramento, California (formerly Raley Field)
Truist Field – Charlotte, North Carolina
Trustmark Park – Pearl, Mississippi
UCCU Ballpark – Orem, Utah
Veterans Memorial Stadium – Cedar Rapids, Iowa
Vince Genna Stadium – Bend, Oregon
Volcanoes Stadium – Keizer, Oregon
Wade Stadium – Duluth, Minnesota
WellSpan Park – York, Pennsylvania
Whataburger Field – Corpus Christi, Texas
Whitaker Bank Ballpark – Lexington, Kentucky (formerly Applebees Park)
Yogi Berra Stadium – Little Falls, New Jersey

Other baseball venues
Howard J. Lamade Stadium – South Williamsport, Pennsylvania
Little League Volunteer Stadium – South Williamsport, Pennsylvania

American football

National Football League

Allegiant Stadium – Las Vegas, Nevada
Arrowhead Stadium – Kansas City, Missouri
AT&T Stadium – Arlington, Texas (formerly Cowboys Stadium)
Bank of America Stadium – Charlotte, North Carolina (formerly Ericsson Stadium)
Bills Stadium – Orchard Park, New York (formerly Ralph Wilson Stadium, Rich Stadium, and New Era Field)
Empower Field at Mile High – Denver (formerly Invesco Field at Mile High, Sports Authority Field at Mile High, and Broncos Stadium at Mile High)
FedExField – Landover, Maryland (formerly Jack Kent Cooke Stadium and Redskins Stadium)
FirstEnergy Stadium – Cleveland (formerly Cleveland Browns Stadium)
Ford Field – Detroit
Gillette Stadium – Foxborough, Massachusetts (formerly CMGI Field)
Hard Rock Stadium – Miami Gardens, Florida (formerly Joe Robbie Stadium, Pro Player Park, Pro Player Stadium, Dolphin Stadium, Dolphins Stadium, LandShark Stadium, and Sun Life Stadium)
Heinz Field – Pittsburgh
Lambeau Field – Green Bay, Wisconsin (formerly City Stadium)
Levi's Stadium – Santa Clara, California
Lincoln Financial Field – Philadelphia
Lucas Oil Stadium – Indianapolis
Lumen Field – Seattle (formerly Seahawks Stadium, Qwest Field, and CenturyLink Field)
M&T Bank Stadium – Baltimore (formerly Ravens Stadium at Camden Yards, PSINet Stadium and Ravens Stadium)
Mercedes-Benz Stadium – Atlanta
Mercedes-Benz Superdome – New Orleans (formerly Louisiana Superdome)
MetLife Stadium – East Rutherford, New Jersey
Nissan Stadium – Nashville, Tennessee (formerly Adelphia Coliseum, The Coliseum and LP Field)
NRG Stadium – Houston, Texas (formerly Reliant Stadium)
Paul Brown Stadium – Cincinnati
Raymond James Stadium – Tampa, Florida
SoFi Stadium – Inglewood, California
Soldier Field – Chicago
State Farm Stadium – Glendale, Arizona (formerly Cardinals Stadium and University of Phoenix Stadium)
TIAA Bank Field – Jacksonville, Florida (formerly the Gator Bowl, Alltel Stadium/Jacksonville Municipal Stadium, and EverBank Field)
U.S. Bank Stadium – Minneapolis

Other American football venues
Aloha Stadium – Honolulu, Hawaii
Tom Benson Hall of Fame Stadium – Canton, Ohio

Auto racing

Atlanta Motor Speedway – Hampton, Georgia
Auto Club Speedway – Fontana, California (formerly California Speedway)
Baton Rouge Raceway – Baker, Louisiana
Beech Ridge Motor Speedway – Scarborough, Maine
Bristol Motor Speedway – Bristol, Tennessee
Charlotte Motor Speedway – Concord, North Carolina
Chicagoland Speedway – Joliet, Illinois
Darlington Raceway – Darlington, South Carolina
Daytona International Speedway – Daytona Beach, Florida
Dover International Speedway – Dover, Delaware
Gainesville Raceway – Gainesville, Florida
Gateway International Raceway – Madison, Illinois
Homestead-Miami Speedway – Homestead, Florida
Indianapolis Motor Speedway – Speedway, Indiana
Infineon Raceway – Sonoma, California (formerly known as Sears Point Raceway)
Kansas Speedway – Kansas City, Kansas
Kentucky Speedway – Sparta, Kentucky
Lake Geneva Raceway – Lake Geneva, Wisconsin
Las Vegas Motor Speedway – Clark County, Nevada
Mansfield Motorsports Park – Mansfield, Ohio
Martinsville Speedway – Martinsville, Virginia
Mazda Raceway Laguna Seca – Monterey, California
Memphis Motorsports Park – Millington, Tennessee
Michigan International Speedway – Brooklyn, Michigan
Milwaukee Mile – West Allis, Wisconsin
Nashville Superspeedway – Lebanon, Tennessee
Nazareth Speedway – Nazareth, Pennsylvania (now closed)
New Egypt Speedway – New Egypt, New Jersey
New Hampshire Motor Speedway – Loudon, New Hampshire
Old Bridge Township Raceway Park – Old Bridge, New Jersey
O'Reilly Raceway Park at Indianapolis – Indianapolis, Indiana
Oxford Plains Speedway – Oxford, Maine
Phoenix International Raceway – Avondale, Arizona
Pikes Peak International Raceway – Fountain, Colorado (now closed)
Pocono Raceway – Long Pond, Pennsylvania
Portland International Raceway – Portland, Oregon
Richmond International Raceway – Richmond, Virginia
Road America – Elkhart Lake, Wisconsin
Rockingham Speedway – Rockingham, North Carolina (formerly North Carolina Speedway)
Seekonk Speedway – Seekonk, Massachusetts
Stafford Motor Speedway – Stafford Springs, Connecticut
Talladega Superspeedway – Talladega, Alabama
Texas Motor Speedway – Justin, Texas
Thompson International Speedway – Thompson, Connecticut
Thunder Road International SpeedBowl – Barre, Vermont
Toyota Speedway at Irwindale – Irwindale, California
Wall Township Speedway – Wall Township, New Jersey
Waterford Speedbowl – Waterford, Connecticut
Watkins Glen International – Watkins Glen, New York

Soccer

Major League Soccer

Audi Field – Washington, D.C.  
Banc of California Stadium – Los Angeles, California
Children's Mercy Park – Kansas City, Kansas 
Dick's Sporting Goods Park – Commerce City, Colorado 
Dignity Health Sports Park – Carson, California 
Exploria Stadium – Orlando, Florida
Gillette Stadium – Foxborough, Massachusetts 
Historic Crew Stadium – Columbus, Ohio
PayPal Park – San Jose, California
Providence Park – Portland, Oregon  
Qwest Field – Seattle, Washington 
Rio Tinto Stadium – Sandy, Utah 
Red Bull Arena – Harrison, New Jersey 
Shell Energy Stadium – Houston, Texas
Soldier Field – Chicago, Illinois
Subaru Park – Chester, Pennsylvania 
Toyota Stadium – Frisco, Texas

United Soccer Leagues
Blackbaud Stadium – Charleston, South Carolina
City Stadium – Richmond, Virginia
DeKalb Memorial Stadium – Clarkston, Georgia
James Griffin Stadium – Saint Paul, Minnesota
Juan Ramón Loubriel Stadium – Bayamón, Puerto Rico
Marina Auto Stadium – Rochester, New York (formerly PAETEC Park)
Uihlein Soccer Park – Milwaukee, Wisconsin
Virginia Beach Sportsplex – Virginia Beach, Virginia
Zions Bank Stadium – Herriman, Utah

Tennis
Arthur Ashe Stadium – Flushing, New York, New York
Connecticut Tennis Center – New Haven, Connecticut
Delray Beach Tennis Center – Delray Beach, Florida
Dignity Health Sports Park – Carson, California
Family Circle Tennis Center – Charleston, South Carolina
Indianapolis Tennis Center – Indianapolis, Indiana
Lindner Family Tennis Center – Mason, Ohio
Louis Armstrong Stadium – Flushing, New York, New York
Newport Casino – Newport, Rhode Island
River Oaks Country Club – Houston, Texas
Stone Mountain Tennis Center – Atlanta
Tennis Center at Crandon Park – Key Biscayne, Florida
West Side Tennis Club – Forest Hills, New York, New York

Track & Field (Outdoor)
Audrey J. Walton Stadium – Columbia, Missouri
Bernie Moore Track Stadium – Baton Rouge, Louisiana
Cessna Stadium – Wichita, Kansas
Cobb Track & Angell Field, Stanford University – Palo Alto, California
Drake Stadium – Des Moines, Iowa
Edwards Stadium – Berkeley, California
Franklin Field – Philadelphia
Hayward Field – Eugene, Oregon
Hilmer Lodge Stadium – Walnut, California
Hornet Stadium, California State University  – Sacramento, California
Icahn Stadium – New York City
IU Michael A. Carroll Track & Soccer Stadium – Indianapolis, Indiana
Lindenwood Hunter Stadium – Saint Charles, Missouri
Memorial Stadium – Lawrence, Kansas
Mike A. Myers Stadium – Austin, Texas
Tad Gormley Stadium – New Orleans, Louisiana

Basketball only, with some minor league hockey
FTX Arena – Miami (formerly American Airlines Arena)
Amway Center – Orlando, Florida
AT&T Center – San Antonio (formerly SBC Center)
Gainbridge Fieldhouse – Indianapolis (formerly Conseco Fieldhouse and Bankers Life Fieldhouse)
Chase Center – San Francisco
Chesapeake Energy Arena – Oklahoma City (formerly Ford Center and Oklahoma City Arena)
FedExForum – Memphis, Tennessee
Fiserv Forum – Milwaukee
Golden 1 Center – Sacramento, California
Moda Center – Portland, Oregon (formerly Rose Garden)
Rocket Mortgage FieldHouse – Cleveland (formerly Gund Arena and Quicken Loans Arena)
Smoothie King Center – New Orleans (formerly New Orleans Arena)
Spectrum Center – Charlotte, North Carolina (formerly Charlotte Bobcats Arena and Time Warner Cable Arena)
Talking Stick Resort Arena – Phoenix, Arizona (formerly America West Arena and US Airways Center)
Target Center – Minneapolis
Toyota Center – Houston
Vivint Smart Home Arena – Salt Lake City (formerly Delta Center and EnergySolutions Arena)

Basketball and ice hockey
American Airlines Center – Dallas
Barclays Center – Brooklyn, New York
Little Caesars Arena – Detroit
Madison Square Garden – New York City
Pepsi Center – Denver
Staples Center – Los Angeles
TD Garden – Boston (formerly Shawmut Center, the FleetCenter, and TD Banknorth Garden)
United Center – Chicago
Capital One Arena – Washington, D.C. (formerly MCI Center and Verizon Center)
Wells Fargo Center – Philadelphia (formerly CoreStates Center, First Union Center, and Wachovia Center)

Ice hockey only, with some college basketball
BB&T Center – Sunrise, Florida (formerly Broward County Civic Arena, National Car Rental Center, Office Depot Center and BankAtlantic Center)
Bridgestone Arena – Nashville, Tennessee (formerly Nashville Arena, Gaylord Entertainment Center and Sommet Center)
Honda Center – Anaheim, California (formerly Anaheim Arena and Arrowhead Pond of Anaheim)
SAP Center at San Jose – San Jose, California (formerly San Jose Arena, Compaq Center at San Jose and HP Pavilion)
First Niagara Center – Buffalo, New York (formerly Marine Midland Arena and HSBC Arena)
Gila River Arena – Glendale, Arizona (formerly Glendale Arena and Jobing.com Arena)
PPG Paints Arena – Pittsburgh, Pennsylvania (formerly the Consol Energy Center)
Nassau Veterans Memorial Coliseum – Uniondale, New York
Nationwide Arena – Columbus, Ohio
PNC Arena – Raleigh, North Carolina (formerly Raleigh Entertainment & Sports Arena and RBC Center)
Prudential Center – Newark, New Jersey
Enterprise Center – St. Louis, Missouri (formerly the Kiel Center, the Savvis Center and ScotTrade Center)
Amalie Arena – Tampa, Florida (formerly Tampa Bay Times Forum and the Ice Palace)
Xcel Energy Center – Saint Paul, Minnesota
T-Mobile Arena – Las Vegas, Nevada

College sports
Other Sports
Mariucci Arena – University of Minnesota, Minneapolis, Minnesota Hockey
Williams Arena – University of Minnesota, Minneapolis, Minnesota Basketball
Ralph Engelstad Arena – University of North Dakota
Carl Maddox Field House – Louisiana State University, Baton Rouge, Louisiana Indoor Track and Field

All facilities are on-campus unless otherwise noted.

American football

Aggie Memorial Stadium – New Mexico State University, Las Cruces, New Mexico
Alamodome – San Antonio, Texas (not a campus facility)
Aloha Stadium – University of Hawaii, Honolulu, Hawaii (off campus)
Alerus Center – University of North Dakota, Grand Forks, North Dakota (off campus)
Alumni Stadium – Boston College, Newton, Massachusetts
Amon G. Carter Stadium – Texas Christian University, Fort Worth, Texas
Arizona Stadium – University of Arizona, Tucson, Arizona
Autzen Stadium – University of Oregon, Eugene, Oregon
Beaver Stadium – Penn State, State College, Pennsylvania
Ben Hill Griffin Stadium (Florida Field) – University of Florida, Gainesville, Florida
Benedum Field – Springfield College, Springfield, Massachusetts
Bill Snyder Family Football Stadium – Kansas State University, Manhattan, Kansas (formerly KSU Stadium)
Bobby Dodd Stadium (Grant Field) – Georgia Tech, Atlanta
Boone Pickens Stadium – Oklahoma State University, Stillwater, Oklahoma
Brigham Field at Huskie Stadium – Northern Illinois University, DeKalb, Illinois
Bright House Networks Stadium – University of Central Florida, Orlando, Florida
Bronco Stadium – Boise State University, Boise, Idaho
Bryant–Denny Stadium – University of Alabama, Tuscaloosa, Alabama
Bulldog Stadium – Fresno State, Fresno, California
Byrd Stadium – University of Maryland, College Park, Maryland
Cajun Field – a.k.a. "The Swamp" – University of Louisiana at Lafayette, Lafayette, Louisiana (on university-owned land, but off the main campus)
Camp Randall Stadium – University of Wisconsin, Madison, Wisconsin
Cardinal Stadium – University of Louisville, Louisville, Kentucky
Carrier Dome – Syracuse University, Syracuse, New York
Carter–Finley Stadium – North Carolina State University, Raleigh, North Carolina (on university-owned land, but off-campus)
Camping World Stadium – University of Central Florida, Orlando, Florida (off campus)
Commonwealth Stadium – University of Kentucky, Lexington, Kentucky
Cotton Bowl – Dallas, Texas (not a campus facility)
Coughlin–Alumni Stadium – South Dakota State University, Brookings, South Dakota
Cramton Bowl – Montgomery, Alabama
Darrell K Royal–Texas Memorial Stadium – University of Texas, Austin, Texas
Dix Stadium – Kent State University, Kent, Ohio
Doak Campbell Stadium (Bobby Bowden Field) – Florida State University, Tallahassee, Florida
Dowdy–Ficklen Stadium – East Carolina University, Greenville, North Carolina
Doyt Perry Stadium – Bowling Green State University, Bowling Green, Ohio
Drake Stadium – Drake University, Des Moines, Iowa
Estes Stadium – University of Central Arkansas, Conway, Arkansas
Falcon Stadium – United States Air Force Academy, Colorado Springs, Colorado
FIU Stadium – Florida International University, Miami, Florida
Floyd Casey Stadium – Baylor University, Waco, Texas
Folsom Field – University of Colorado, Boulder, Colorado
Fouts Field – University of North Texas, Denton, Texas
Franklin Field – University of Pennsylvania, Philadelphia
Fred Yager Stadium – Miami University, Oxford, Ohio
Gaylord Family Oklahoma Memorial Stadium (Owen Field) – University of Oklahoma, Norman, Oklahoma
Gerald J. Ford Stadium – Southern Methodist University, University Park, Texas
Glass Bowl – University of Toledo, Toledo, Ohio
Groves Stadium – Wake Forest University, Winston-Salem, North Carolina
Harvard Stadium – Harvard University, Boston, Massachusetts
Heinz Field – University of Pittsburgh, Pittsburgh, Pennsylvania (off campus)
Hubert Jack Stadium – Lock Haven University of Pennsylvania
Hubert H. Humphrey Metrodome – University of Minnesota, Minneapolis, Minnesota (off campus)
Hughes Stadium – Colorado State University, Fort Collins, Colorado (on university-owned land, but off-campus)
Husky Stadium – University of Washington, Seattle, Washington
Independence Stadium – Shreveport, Louisiana (not a campus facility)
Indian Stadium – Arkansas State University, Jonesboro, Arkansas
Jack Trice Stadium – Iowa State University, Ames, Iowa
Jeld-Wen Field – Portland State University, Portland, Oregon
Joan C. Edwards Stadium – Marshall University, Huntington, West Virginia
Joe Aillet Stadium – Louisiana Tech University, Ruston, Louisiana
Johnny Red Floyd Stadium – Middle Tennessee State University, Murfreesboro, Tennessee
Jones AT&T Stadium – Texas Tech University, Lubbock, Texas
Jordan–Hare Stadium – Auburn University, Auburn, Alabama
Kelly/Shorts Stadium – Central Michigan University, Mount Pleasant, Michigan
Kenan Memorial Stadium – University of North Carolina, Chapel Hill, North Carolina
Kibbie Dome – University of Idaho, Moscow, Idaho
Kimbrough Memorial Stadium – West Texas A&M University, Canyon, Texas
Kinnick Stadium – University of Iowa, Iowa City, Iowa
Kyle Field – Texas A&M University, College Station, Texas
Ladd–Peebles Stadium – Mobile, Alabama
Lane Stadium – Virginia Tech, Blacksburg, Virginia
LaVell Edwards Stadium – Brigham Young University, Provo, Utah
Legion Field – University of Alabama at Birmingham, Birmingham, Alabama (off campus)
Liberty Bowl Memorial Stadium – University of Memphis, Memphis, Tennessee (off campus)
Lincoln Financial Field – Temple University, Philadelphia (off campus)
Los Angeles Memorial Coliseum – University of Southern California, Los Angeles (off campus)
M. M. Roberts Stadium – University of Southern Mississippi, Hattiesburg, Mississippi
Mackay Stadium – University of Nevada, Reno, Nevada
Malone Stadium – University of Louisiana at Monroe, Monroe, Louisiana
Martin Stadium – Washington State University, Pullman, Washington
Memorial Stadium – University of California, Berkeley, Berkeley, California
Memorial Stadium – Clemson University, Clemson, South Carolina
Memorial Stadium (Zuppke Field) – University of Illinois, Champaign, Illinois
Memorial Stadium – Indiana University, Bloomington, Indiana
Memorial Stadium – University of Kansas, Lawrence, Kansas
Memorial Stadium (Faurot Field) – University of Missouri, Columbia, Missouri 
Memorial Stadium – University of Nebraska, Lincoln, Nebraska
McCulloch Stadium – Willamette University, Salem, Oregon (off campus)
Miami Orange Bowl – University of Miami, Miami, Florida (off campus)
Michie Stadium – United States Military Academy, West Point, New York
Michigan Stadium – University of Michigan, Ann Arbor, Michigan
Milan Puskar Stadium – West Virginia University, Morgantown, West Virginia (formerly Mountaineer Field, which is still included in the complete name of the stadium)
Mississippi Veterans Memorial Stadium – Jackson State University, Jackson, Mississippi
Movie Gallery Stadium – Troy University, Troy, Alabama (formerly Troy Memorial Stadium)
Navy–Marine Corps Memorial Stadium – United States Naval Academy, Annapolis, Maryland
Neyland Stadium – University of Tennessee, Knoxville, Tennessee
Nippert Stadium – University of Cincinnati, Cincinnati
Notre Dame Stadium – University of Notre Dame, Notre Dame, Indiana
Ohio Stadium – Ohio State University, Columbus, Ohio
Peden Stadium – Ohio University, Athens, Ohio
Perkins Stadium – University of Wisconsin-Whitewater, Whitewater, Wisconsin
Princeton Stadium – Princeton University, Princeton, New Jersey
Qualcomm Stadium – San Diego State University, San Diego, California (off campus)
Raymond James Stadium – University of South Florida, Tampa, Florida (off campus)
Razorback Stadium – University of Arkansas, Fayetteville, Arkansas
Rentschler Field – University of Connecticut, East Hartford, Connecticut (off campus)
Reser Stadium – Oregon State University, Corvallis, Oregon
Rhodes Stadium – Elon University, Elon, North Carolina
Rice Stadium – Rice University, Houston, Texas
Rice-Eccles Stadium – University of Utah, Salt Lake City, Utah
Romney Stadium – Utah State University, Logan, Utah
Rose Bowl – UCLA, Pasadena, California (off campus)
Ross–Ade Stadium – Purdue University, West Lafayette, Indiana
Rubber Bowl – University of Akron, Akron, Ohio
Rutgers Stadium – Rutgers University, New Brunswick, New Jersey
Ryan Field – Northwestern University, Evanston, Illinois
Rynearson Stadium – Eastern Michigan University, Ypsilanti, Michigan
Sam Boyd Stadium – UNLV, Whitney, Nevada (off campus)
Sanford Stadium – University of Georgia, Athens, Georgia
Scheumann Stadium – Ball State University, Muncie, Indiana
Scott Field – Mississippi State University, Starkville, Mississippi
Scott Stadium – University of Virginia, Charlottesville, Virginia
Schoellkopf Field – Cornell University, Ithaca, New York
Skelly Stadium – University of Tulsa, Tulsa, Oklahoma
Spartan Stadium – Michigan State University, East Lansing, Michigan
Spartan Stadium – San Jose State University, San Jose, California (on university-owned land, but off the main campus)
Special Olympics Stadium – State University of New York at Brockport, Brockport, New York
Stanford Stadium – Stanford University, Palo Alto, California
Sun Bowl Stadium – University of Texas at El Paso, El Paso, Texas
Sun Devil Stadium – Arizona State University, Tempe, Arizona
Superior Dome – Northern Michigan University, Marquette, Michigan
Tiger Stadium – Louisiana State University, Baton Rouge, Louisiana
TCF Bank Stadium – University of Minnesota Minneapolis, Minnesota 
TDECU Stadium – University of Houston, Houston, Texas
University at Buffalo Stadium – University at Buffalo, Buffalo, New York
University Stadium – University of New Mexico, Albuquerque, New Mexico
Vanderbilt Stadium – Vanderbilt University, Nashville, Tennessee
Vaught–Hemingway Stadium – University of Mississippi, Oxford, Mississippi
Waldo Stadium – Western Michigan University, Kalamazoo, Michigan
Wallace Wade Stadium – Duke University, Durham, North Carolina
War Memorial Stadium – University of Arkansas, Little Rock, Arkansas (occasional use; the school's main campus is in Fayetteville)
War Memorial Stadium – Kahului, Hawaii (not a campus facility)
War Memorial Stadium – University of Wyoming, Laramie, Wyoming
Williams-Brice Stadium – University of South Carolina, Columbia, South Carolina
Yale Bowl – Yale University, New Haven, Connecticut
Yulman Stadium – Tulane University, New Orleans

Baseball
Alex Box Stadium – Louisiana State University, Baton Rouge, Louisiana
Bob Wren Stadium – Ohio University, Athens, Ohio
Dan Law Field at Rip Griffin Park – Texas Tech University, Lubbock, Texas
Dick Howser Stadium – Florida State University, Tallahassee, Florida
Doug Kingsmore Stadium – Clemson University, Clemson, South Carolina
Evans Diamond – University of California at Berkeley, Berkeley, California
Goss Stadium at Coleman Field – Oregon State University, Corvallis, Oregon
Hammons Field – Missouri State University, Springfield, Missouri (off campus)
Johnny Rosenblatt Stadium – Omaha, Nebraska (not used by an individual school, but rather by the annual NCAA tournament, the College World Series)
Stanley G. McKie Field at Joseph P. Hayden Jr. Park – Miami University, Oxford, Ohio
Olsen Field – Texas A&M University, College Station, Texas
Packard Stadium – Arizona State University, Tempe, Arizona
Pete Beiden Field – Fresno State, Fresno, California
Pete Taylor Park – The University of Southern Mississippi, Hattiesburg, Mississippi
Pioneer Park – Tusculum College, Greeneville, Tennessee
Reckling Park – Rice University, Houston, Texas
Rio Grande Credit Union Field at Isotopes Park – University of New Mexico, Albuquerque, New Mexico (off campus)
Siebert Field – University of Minnesota, Minneapolis, Minnesota
Smith's Ballpark – University of Utah, Salt Lake City, Utah (off campus)
Stephen Schott Stadium – Santa Clara University, Santa Clara, California
Tony Gwynn Stadium – San Diego State University, San Diego
Turchin Stadium – Tulane University, New Orleans
UCCU Ballpark – Utah Valley University, Orem, Utah
World War Memorial Stadium – North Carolina A&T and Greensboro College, Greensboro, North Carolina (off campus for both)

Basketball
State Farm Center – University of Illinois, Champaign, Illinois
Assembly Hall – Indiana University, Bloomington, Indiana
Beard–Eaves–Memorial Coliseum – Auburn University, Auburn, Alabama
Fiserv Forum – Marquette University, Milwaukee, Wisconsin
Breslin Student Events Center – Michigan State University, East Lansing, Michigan
Bryce Jordan Center – State College, Pennsylvania
Bud Walton Arena – Fayetteville, Arkansas
Carver–Hawkeye Arena – University of Iowa, Iowa City, Iowa
Chaifetz Arena – St. Louis University (SLU), St. Louis, Missouri
Chiles Center – University of Portland, Portland, Oregon
Coleman Coliseum – University of Alabama, Tuscaloosa, Alabama
Convocation Center – Ohio University, Athens, Ohio
Crisler Arena – University of Michigan, Ann Arbor, Michigan
Donald L. Tucker Civic Center – Florida State University, Tallahassee, Florida
Frost Arena – South Dakota State University, Brookings, South Dakota
Gill Coliseum – Oregon State University, Corvallis, Oregon
John D. Millett Hall – Miami University, Oxford, Ohio
Joyce Center – University of Notre Dame, Notre Dame, Indiana
Kohl Center – University of Wisconsin, Madison, Wisconsin
Littlejohn Coliseum – Clemson University, Clemson, South Carolina
Mackey Arena – Purdue University, West Lafayette, Indiana
McArthur Court – University of Oregon, Eugene, Oregon
McKenzie Arena – University of Tennessee at Chattanooga, Chattanooga, Tennessee
Pete Maravich Assembly Center – Louisiana State University, Baton Rouge, Louisiana
Reed Green Coliseum – University of Southern Mississippi, Hattiesburg, Mississippi
Save Mart Center – Fresno State, Fresno, California
Shoemaker Center – University of Cincinnati, Cincinnati
Thompson–Boling Arena – University of Tennessee, Knoxville, Tennessee
Rupp Arena – University of Kentucky, Lexington, Kentucky
United Spirit Arena – Texas Tech University, Lubbock, Texas
Wells Fargo Arena – Arizona State University, Tempe, Arizona
Welsh-Ryan Arena – Northwestern University, Evanston, Illinois
Williams Arena – University of Minnesota, Minneapolis
Wolstein Center – Cleveland State University, Cleveland
Value City Arena – Ohio State University, Columbus, Ohio

Historical stadiums
Arlington Stadium – Arlington, Texas (1965–1993)
Astrodome – Houston, Texas (1965–1999)
Atlanta–Fulton County Stadium – Atlanta (1966–1996)
Baker Bowl – Philadelphia (1887–1938)
BMO Harris Bradley Center – Milwaukee (1988–2018)
Boston Garden – Boston (1928–1998)
Braves Field – Boston, Massachusetts (1915–1952)
Busch Memorial Stadium – St. Louis, Missouri (1966–2005)
Candlestick Park – San Francisco, California (1960–2014)
Chicago Stadium – Chicago (1929–1994)
Comiskey Park – Chicago (1910–1990)
Cinergy Field – Cincinnati (1970–2002)
Cleveland Arena – Cleveland (1937–1974)
Cleveland Municipal Stadium – Cleveland (1932–1996)
Coliseum at Richfield – Richfield, Ohio (1974–1994)
Corcoran Stadium – Cincinnati (1929–1973)
Crosley Field – Cincinnati (1912–1970)
Ebbets Field – Brooklyn, New York (1913–1957)
Exposition Park – Pittsburgh (1890–1909)
Forbes Field – Pittsburgh, Pennsylvania (1909–1970)
Foxboro Stadium – Foxborough, Massachusetts (1971–2001)
Griffith Stadium – Washington, D.C. (1891–1961)
Honolulu Stadium – Honolulu, Hawaii (1926–1976)
Hubert H. Humphrey Metrodome – Minneapolis (1982–2013)
John F. Kennedy Stadium – Philadelphia (1925?-1991?)
Kezar Stadium – San Francisco, California (1925–1988)
Kingdome – Seattle, Washington (1976–1999)
League Park – Cleveland (1891–1948)
Lockhart Stadium – Miami
Los Angeles Memorial Sports Arena – Los Angeles
Market Square Arena – Indianapolis (1974–1999)
Memorial Stadium – Baltimore (1954–2001)
Memorial Stadium (University of Minnesota) – Minneapolis, Minnesota (1924–1981)
Metropolitan Stadium – Bloomington, Minnesota (1956–1981)
Mile High Stadium – Denver, Colorado (1948–2000)
Milwaukee County Stadium – Milwaukee, Wisconsin (1953–2000)
Municipal Stadium – Kansas City, Missouri (1923–1976)
Northrop Field – Minneapolis (1899–1923)
Pitt Stadium – Pittsburgh (1925–1999)
Polo Grounds – New York City (1883–1963)
Portland Ice Arena – Portland, Oregon (1914–1950s)
RCA Dome – Indianapolis (1984–2008)
Shea Stadium – Queens, New York (1964–2008)
Shibe Park – Philadelphia (1909–1976)
Sicks' Stadium – Seattle (1938–1969)
Pontiac Silverdome – Pontiac, Michigan (1975–2001)
Sportsman's Park – St. Louis, Missouri (1902–1966)
Stagg Field – Chicago (1893–1957)
Tampa Stadium – Tampa, Florida (1967–1998)
Temple Stadium – Philadelphia (1928–1997)
The Dome at America's Center – St. Louis, Missouri (1995–2016)
Three Rivers Stadium – Pittsburgh (1970–2000)
Tiger Stadium – Detroit, Michigan (1912–1999)
Tulane Stadium – New Orleans (1926–1980)
Vaughn Street Park – Portland, Oregon (1901–1956)
Veterans Stadium – Philadelphia (1971–2003)
War Memorial Stadium – Buffalo, New York (1937–1988)
Waverly Fairgrounds – Elizabeth, New Jersey (1873)
Wrigley Field – Los Angeles (1925–1961)
Yankee Stadium – New York City (1923–2008)

See also
List of stadiums in Africa
List of stadiums in Asia
List of stadiums in Central America and the Caribbean
List of stadiums in Europe
List of stadiums in Oceania
List of stadiums in South America
List of North American stadiums by capacity

External links 
Atlas of worldwide soccer stadiums for GoogleEarth ***NEW***
cafe.daum.net/stade
worldstadiums
Football Stadiums
Football Temples of the World

Stadiums
North America